Henry Lance (1833 – 19 May 1886) was an English cricketer. He played in two first-class matches in New Zealand for Canterbury from 1863 to 1865.

See also
 List of Canterbury representative cricketers

References

External links
 

1833 births
1886 deaths
English cricketers
Canterbury cricketers
Cricketers from Somerset